Bad Comments  is a 2021 Nollywood film that stars Jim Iyke who also is the executive producer. The movie was released by FilmONE production company and was theatrically released on August 27, 2021. The film stars Jim Iyke, Osas Ighodaro, Yemi Blaq, Ini Edo, Sharon Ooja, Ayo Makun, Chiwetalu Agu, Ruggedman.

Plot 
The movie follows the life of Frank Orji with a vibrant acting career but who get his reputation tarnished following the release of an edited video online. This leads to excessive cyberbullying by online trolls. With the help of a hacker, his bodyguard and his personal assistant is able to track down  these trolls and give them a tastes of their own medicine.

Cast 

 Jim Iyke
 Osas Ighodaro
 Ini Edo
 Yomi Black
 Chiwetalu Agu
 Ayo Makun
 Patience Ozokwor
 Sharon Ooja
Ruggedman
Ben Lugo Touitou

See also
List of Nigerian films of 2021

References

External links 

English-language Nigerian films
2021 films
2020s English-language films